Altaite, or lead telluride, is a yellowish white mineral with an isometric crystal structure. Altaite is in the galena group of minerals as it shares many of properties of galena. Altaite has an unusually high density for a light-colored mineral. Altaite and other rare tellurides are classified in the sulfide mineral class (Dana classification).

Altaite was discovered in 1845 in the Altai Mountains. Besides these mountains altaite can also be found in Zyryanovsk, Kazakhstan; the Ritchie Creek Deposit in Price County, Wisconsin; the Koch-Bulak gold deposit in Kazakhstan; Moctezuma, Mexico; and Coquimbo, Chile among other locations.

See also
List of minerals

References

Lead minerals
Telluride minerals
Galena group
Cubic minerals
Minerals in space group 225
Minerals described in 1845